The Mexibús Line IV is a bus rapid transit (BRT) line in the Mexibús system. It operates between the Universidad Mexiquense del Bicentenario (UMB) in Tecámac and Indios Verdes metro station in Gustavo A. Madero, Mexico City. It was the fourth line to be built and the fourth to be opened. It was inaugurated by the governor of the State of Mexico, Alfredo del Mazo Maza on 24 February 2021. It has 28 operative stations and one is under construction. The line has two different types of services, and both include a service exclusively for women and children named Servicio Rosa (Pink Service). The line operates with 71 buses.

While the line was under construction, Line II provided a provisional route from Las Américas to Indios Verdes.

History and construction
The line began construction in June 2014, and was expected to open since 2015. It started free pre-operative tests on 24 February 2021. Operations started on 9 October 2021.

Stations

{| width="80%"  class="wikitable"
! colspan="2" align="center" width="30%"| Station
!align="center"|O
!align="center"|Ex
! align="center"| Location
! align="center"| Connection
! align="center"| Picture
! align="center"| Opened
|-
| rowspan="29" width="2%" bgcolor="FF9F00" |  
|  Indios Verdes
|align="center"|●
|align="center"|●
| Gustavo A. Madero, Mexico City
| 
 Line 1: Indios Verdes station
 Indios Verdes
  Line 3: Indios Verdes station
 : Line 1: Indios Verdes station
 : Line 3: Indios Verdes station
 : Line 7: Indios Verdes station
 Line 2: Indios Verdes station (under construction)
 Routes: 101, 101-A, 101-B, 101-D, 102, 107-B (at distance), 108
| 
| rowspan="20" | 24 February 2021
|-
|  Periférico
|align="center"|●
|align="center"|●
| rowspan="2" | Tlalnepantla de Baz
| rowspan="6" |
|
|-
|  Martín Carrera
|align="center"|●
|align="center"|
|
|-
|  Clínica 76
|align="center"|●
|align="center"|●
| rowspan="22" | Ecatepec de Morelos
| 
|-
|  Vía Morelos
|align="center"|●
|align="center"|
|
|-
|  Monumento a Morelos
|align="center"|●
|align="center"|
| 
|-
|  5 de Febrero
|align="center"|●
|align="center"|
|
|-
|  Santa Clara
|align="center"|●
|align="center"|●
|
 Line 1: Santa Clara station
| 
|-
|  Cerro Gordo
|align="center"|●
|align="center"|
| rowspan="11" | 
|
|-
|  Servicios Administrativos
|align="center"|●
|align="center"|
|
|-
|  Clínica 93
|align="center"|●
|align="center"|●
|
|-
|  Industrial
|align="center"|●
|align="center"|
|
|-
|  5ta. Aparición
|align="center"|●
|align="center"|
|
|-
|  Tulpetlac
|align="center"|●
|align="center"|●
|
|-
|  Siervo de la Nación
|align="center"|●
|align="center"|
|
|-
|  Nuevo Laredo
|align="center"|●
|align="center"|●
|
|-
|  Laureles
|align="center"|●
|align="center"|
|
|-
|  La Viga
|align="center"|●
|align="center"|
|
|-
|  San Cristóbal
|align="center"|●
|align="center"|
|
|-
|  Puente de Fierro
|align="center"|●
|align="center"|●
|
  Line II: Puente de Fierro station
|
|-
|  Izcalli Palomas
|align="center"|●
|align="center"|
|
|
| rowspan="2"| 9 October 2021
|-
|  Central de Abastos
|align="center"|●
|align="center"|●
|
  Line I: Central de Abastos station
 Central de Abastos
|
|-
|  Santo Tomás Chiconautla
|align="center"|●
|align="center"|
| rowspan="8" |
|
| Under construction
|-
|  Ejido Santo Tomás
|align="center"|●
|align="center"|
|
| rowspan="6" | 9 October 2021
|-
|  Revolución
|align="center"|●
|align="center"|
|
|-
|  Margarito F. Ayala
|align="center"|●
|align="center"|
| rowspan="4" | Tecámac
|
|-
|  Flores
|align="center"|●
|align="center"|●
|
|-
|  Bosques
|align="center"|●
|align="center"|
|
|-
|  Universidad Mexiquense del Bicentenario
|align="center"|●
|align="center"|●
| 
|}

Expansion
The line is expected to connect with the Felipe Ángeles International Airport, in Zumpango Municipality to the north. To the south, it is expected to be expanded toward La Raza metro station.

{| width="80%"  class="wikitable"
! colspan="2" align="center" width="30%"| Station
!align="center"|O
!align="center"|Ex
! align="center"| Location
! align="center"| Connection
! align="center"| Picture
! align="center"| Opened
|-
| width="2%" bgcolor="FF9F00" |  
|  La Raza
|align="center"|●
|align="center"|●
| Gustavo A. Madero, Mexico City
|
 La Raza
  Line 3: La Raza station
  Line 5: La Raza station
  Line 1: La Raza station
  Line 3: La Raza station
 Routes: 11-A (at distance), 12 (at distance), 23, 27-A, 103
 Line 1: La Raza stop (north–south route)
 Route: 7-D (at distance)
|
| Under construction
|}

Notes

References

External links
 

2021 establishments in Mexico
4